The Cranston Fire was a wildfire that burned in southwest Riverside County, California, in the United States. The fire was started on July 25, 2018, by Brandon M. McGlover, in an act of arson. The Cranston Fire impacted the communities of Idyllwild and Mountain Center, as well as recreational activities in the Lake Hemet area, San Bernardino National Forest and Mount San Jacinto State Park. Over 7,000 people were evacuated due to the Cranston Fire.

Events

July
The Cranston Fire was started on July 25, around noon, by Brandon M. McGlover, who allegedly started numerous fires in the region that day. By the evening, the fire had burned , with five percent containment. Over 2,000 people were evacuated, including Mountain Center, Idyllwild, Lake Hemet, a Girl Scouts camp and more. Portions of Highway 74 and Highway 243 were closed.

Evacuations were expanded to include Cedar Glen, Fern Valley, Mount San Jacinto State Park, and Pine Cove. Numerous areas, including campgrounds, in both the State Park and San Bernardino National Forest were closed. The fire was reported to have destroyed five homes.

By July 27, over 7,000 people were evacuated due to the Cranston Fire. The fire had short, active runs in the southeast area of the fire, however, good suppression efforts were made. Caltrans focused on removing debris from highways. By the next day, July 28, two firefighters were reported injured and Hamilton High School was named an evacuation center. The fire continued to grow into Garner Valley. Evacuation orders were put in place, and then lifted later that evening, for Garner Valley. Crews made significant efforts to keep the fire out of the southern and eastern parts of Idyllwild as the fire threatened fire retardant lines. Repopulation began in areas of Garner Valley and on July 29 repopulation started in Fern Valley, Pine Cove, Cedar Glen, and parts of Idyllwild. By that evening, 560 people remained evacuated and the fire had been over half contained. Twelve buildings had been damaged and five damaged. One shelter was closed.

Crews focused on mopping up and securing the fire's edge and containment lines were near finished around Idyllwild. Repair began to reduce erosion and mitigate impacts to natural resources as a result of fire suppression efforts. The next day, July 31, Southern California Edison crews focused on restoring power by installing new power poles. Hazard trees were removed and light precipitation aided in fire suppression. By the evening of July 31, the fire had burned  and was 89 percent contained.

August

As the Cranston Fire continued to burn into August, no new growth was reported. Teams began to be demobilized as the fire moved towards containment with mop up and suppression repair efforts in progress. Caltrans focused on removing hazardous trees on roadways while Southern California Edison focused on power restoration. Evacuation orders were lifted for  Idyllwild, Pine Cove, Fern Valley, Cedar Glen and the western portion of Garner Valley up to Lake View Drive at the Lake Hemet Market. By the morning of August 2, the Cranston Fire had burned  and was 92 percent contained, with 100 percent containment anticipated by August 9. On August 10, 2018, the Cranston Fire was fully contained.

Impact

The fire caused evacuations in residential areas, including Mountain Center, Idyllwild, Pine Cove, and Cedar Glen, as well as evacuations and closures in Mount San Jacinto State Park and the San Jacinto Ranger District of the San Bernardino National Forest. It also caused road closures along Highway 74 and Highway 243, impacting access to Hemet. Parts of Highway 74 and Highway 243 were later closed multiple times due to the threat of mudslides caused by the fire. Areas in the Mountain Center area were also ordered to evacuate multiple times due to this threat. Additionally, it caused numerous trail closures, including the Pacific Crest Trail. Parts of the National Forest were ordered closed until July 31, 2019. Over 7,000 people were evacuated due to the fire.

Transportation

Numerous portions of Highway 74, Highway 371 and Highway 243 were closed as a result of the fire, specifically in the areas of Hemet and Banning. Temporary flight restrictions were in place for the area. The Palm Springs Aerial Tramway was closed for four days due to the fire.

Recreation

San Bernardino National Forest was closed as a result of the Cranston Fire. Additional recreational closures included Santa Rosa and San Jacinto Mountains National Monument and Mount San Jacinto State Park.

Investigation

On July 25, the same day the fire was reported, CAL FIRE arrested Brandon N. McGlover for setting multiple fires in Riverside County. He was charged with 15 felony counts of arson for starting nine fires. McGlover was sentenced to 12 years and four months in prison, must register as an arsonist for life, and is required to pay restitution to victims.

See also
 2018 California wildfires
 List of fires in San Bernardino National Forest
 Mountain Fire

References

External links
 
 San Bernardino National Forest Cranston Fire Closure Order No. 05-12-55-18-01
 Forest Closure Order Map

2018 California wildfires
July 2018 crimes in the United States
July 2018 events in the United States
San Bernardino National Forest
Wildfires in Riverside County, California
Crimes in Riverside County, California
California wildfires caused by arson